Peter Turbitt (born 1 July 1951) is an English former professional footballer who played as a right winger.

Career
Born in Keighley, Turbitt spent his early career with Steeton and Keighley Central. He signed for Bradford City in July 1969, and made 8 league appearances for the club, before being released in 1971.

Sources

References

1951 births
Living people
English footballers
Steeton A.F.C. players
Keighley Central F.C. players
Bradford City A.F.C. players
English Football League players
Association football wingers